Life Blood is a supernatural horror film released in 2009. The film was directed and produced by Ron Carlson.

Plot
On New Year's Eve 1968, a lesbian couple, named Brooke and Rhea, encounter the Creator of the Universe while driving on the Pearblossom Highway as they leave a party, when Brooke killed a rapist. The women are laid to rest for 40 years and awake New Year's Day 2009... as vampires. The film follows them as they are meant to lead a life of greater purpose.

Instructed to devour evil, and thereby gain eternal life, the story portrays their first 24 hours of survival as these reborn creatures. Brooke starts to go on a killing spree, to prove herself loyal to the Creator, while Rhea tries to put a stop to the chaos that Brooke started after she kills a sheriff, his deputies, a married couple on vacation, and a hitch-hiker.

The film ends with Rhea killing Brooke by impaling her with a stop sign, when Brooke refused to devour evil souls but to devour good souls. After telling her story to Lizzy, Rhea tries to start her life all over again, this time, as a vampire, not knowing that Brooke is still alive, presumably plotting her revenge.

Cast

Production
Pearblossom began production in late May 2007, was than renamed Murder World.

Release
Originally titled Pearblossom, it was renamed Life Blood for the DVD release, which came out on 27 April 2010 through Lionsgate in the USA.

Background
It features actress Scout Taylor-Compton, known for portraying Laurie Strode in the horror film remake Halloween, and Electra Avellan who previously appeared in Grindhouse with her twin sister. Taylor-Compton has gone on to say that her appearance is not a starring role, but a cameo.

References

External links

2000s science fiction horror films
2009 horror films
2009 films
2000s English-language films